Baptism of Christ is a 1588 oil on canvas painting by Cornelis Cornelisz van Haarlem, now in the Musée du Louvre, in Paris, which acquired it in 1983 (RF 1983-25).

References

1588 paintings
Paintings by Cornelis van Haarlem
Paintings of the Baptism of Christ
Paintings in the Louvre by Dutch, Flemish and German artists